High Atmosphere: Ballads and Banjo Tunes from Virginia and North Carolina is a 1975 compilation album released by Rounder Records. The album is composed of Appalachian folk music recordings gathered by musicologist John Cohen in North Carolina and Virginia in 1965.

The album was originally released in 1975.  In 1995, Rounder re-released the album with an additional twenty minutes of bonus tracks, and omission of the track 'Old Jimmy Sutton' played by Estil C. Ball & Wade Reedy from the original vinyl.

Indiana University Press' The Journal of Folklore Research has asserted that a Lloyd Chandler song on the album, "A Conversation With Death" was an early form of "O Death"—a song which Ralph Stanley won a Grammy award for, featured on the O Brother, Where Art Thou  soundtrack.

Burgin Mathews of Allmusic says the album is "one of the finest compilations of old-time field recordings available" and "should be of equal interest to academics, musicians, and the merely curious".

The alternative country group Uncle Tupelo's 1992 album March 16–20, 1992 includes three covers of songs from High Atmosphere.  Jeff Tweedy is the vocalist on all of these cover versions.

Track listing (1995 release)

Notes and references

External links
 Album page on Rounder Records

Old-time music
Works about Appalachia
Folk albums by American artists
1975 compilation albums
Folk compilation albums